Tân Lạc is a rural district of Hòa Bình province in the Northwest region of Vietnam. As of 2019, the district had a population of 86,889. The district capital lies at Mãn Đức.

Administrative divisions
Tân Lạc is divided into 16 commune-level sub-divisions, including the township of Lương Sơn and 10 rural communes (Đông Lai, Gia Mô, Lỗ Sơn, Mỹ Hòa, Ngổ Luông, Ngọc Mỹ, Nhân Mỹ, Phong Phú, Phú Cường, Phú Vinh, Quyết Chiến, Suối Hoa, Thanh Hối, Tử Nê, Vân Sơn).

References

Districts of Hòa Bình province
Hòa Bình province